Wolfgang Ospelt (5 January 1965 - 4 September 2022) was a Liechtensteiner former association football player. He played as a midfielder. Between 1990 and 1995, Ospelt won 10 caps for the Liechtenstein national football team.

References

Association football midfielders
Liechtenstein footballers
Liechtenstein international footballers
FC Vaduz players
1965 births
Living people